Professor Mian Bakhsh Laghari was a Pakistani (Sindhi) scholar who translated many books from sindhi to English and English to sindhi.

Early life 

Mian Bakhsh Laghari was born on 1944, in a well known and well educated village of Jaffer Khan Laghari in district Sangher, Sindh Pakistan in Asia.

Death 

He died in a road accident near Jamshoro, Sindh Pakistan on December 25, 1999, at the age of 55.

References

 https://web.archive.org/web/20110824154719/http://pmbl.webs.com/

Baloch people
Pakistani educational theorists
Pakistani essayists
Pakistani scholars
Road incident deaths in Pakistan
Academic staff of the University of Sindh
Sindhi people
People from Sanghar District